"I'm Gonna Be a Wheel Someday"  is a popular song written by Roy Hayes, Fats Domino and Dave Bartholomew. The song was first recorded by Bobby Mitchell & The Toppers in 1957 and released in the same year.

Origin
The song's lyrics were written by factory worker and amateur songwriter Roy Hayes (b. 1935, Henderson, Louisiana), after hearing a throwaway comment by a fellow worker.  He wrote the lyrics and forwarded them to Dave Bartholomew, who agreed to record the song as a demo.  In 1957, Bartholomew recorded another version of the song with singer Bobby Mitchell, released as a single on Imperial Records.  Though Mitchell's version was locally successful it did not reach the national charts.

Fats Domino recording
When Bartholomew recorded the song again with Fats Domino in 1959 and released it as the B-side of "I Want To Walk You Home", it became a chart hit, reaching number 22 on the Billboard R&B chart.

Chart history

Cover versions
"I'm Gonna Be a Wheel Someday" was later covered by: 
Sandy Nelson
Wayne Fontana and The Mindbenders
Boots Randolph
Defenders
Asleep at the Wheel
Orion and Herbie Hancock with George Porter Jr.
Zigaboo Modeliste
Sheryl Crow
Paul McCartney (1988 ; issued on the CHOBA B CCCP covers album), and Renard Poché.

References

1957 singles
Fats Domino songs
Songs written by Dave Bartholomew
1957 songs
Songs written by Fats Domino